The 1966 Individual Long Track European Championship was the tenth edition of the Long Track European Championship. The final was held on 17 July 1966 in Mühldorf, West Germany.

The title was won by Manfred Poschenreider of Sweden.

Venues
Qualifying Round 1 - Scheeßel, 5 June 1966
Qualifying Round 2 - Lahti, 19 June 1966
Qualifying Round 3 - Skive, 26 June 1966
Final - Mühldorf, 17 July 1966

Final Classification

References 

Motor
Motor
International sports competitions hosted by West Germany